= Geh Geh =

Nigerian Content Creator

- Born: Ojaigho Prosper; May 6, 1996 (age 30); Warri, Delta, Nigeria
- Other name: Professor Geh Geh
- Occupations: Influencer; content creator; entrepreneur
- Years active: 2020–present

Instagram information
- Page: official_gehgeh
- Followers: 2 million

TikTok information
- Page: official_gegeh
- Followers: 4.1 million

YouTube information
- Channel: gehgeh2172
- Views: 2.1M views
- Last updated: June 30, 2026

Ojaigho Prosper (born May 6, 1996), known professionally as Geh Geh, is a Nigerian actor, influencer, content creator, and entrepreneur.

== Career ==
Geh Geh began his social media career in 2020, initially posting comedic videos. In 2021, he transitioned to creating life lesson videos. Between 2022 and 2023, he continued producing this type of content. He has described himself as the richest man in Delta State and a financial expert. In 2024, he began posting financial advice videos on TikTok.

In August 2025, Geh Geh opened an online university GehGeh University of Wisdom and Understanding.

Geh Geh has been known for his signature sounds and phrases, including "Opueh," "I go pour you spit," and "Had I known is the last comment of a fool." In October 2025, GehGeh was named a brand ambassador for Landnest Homes and Properties.

== Filmography ==
- Trenches Love (2025) as himself
- Geh Geh Marriage (2025) as himself
- Costly Mistake (2026)
- Dark Choices (2026)
- Crazy Prince (2026)
- A Hand to Hold (2026)
- Holy Deception (2026)
